Faryab (also Romanized as Fāryāb, Fāreyāb, and Fāriāb; also known as Pārīān and Tarian) is a village in Poshtkuh Rural District, Bushkan District, Dashtestan County, Bushehr Province, Iran. At the 2006 census, its population was 2,027, in 483 families.

References 

Populated places in Dashtestan County